The sixth season of the reality television series Black Ink Crew: Chicago aired on VH1 from December 4, 2019 until July 27, 2020. It chronicles the daily operations and staff drama at an African American owned and operated tattoo shop 9MAG located in Chicago, Illinois.

Main cast
Ryan Henry
Charmaine Walker
Jessica Simpson
Phor Brumfield
Don Brumfield

Recurring cast
Ashley P
Rachel
NeekBey
Brittney Slam
Gina
Draya
Prince
Fly Tatted
Plug
Zach
Miss Kitty
Danielle Jamison
Bella
Katrina Jackson
Van Johnson
Briana Johnson
Lily
Star
King JaBri
Nelly
Steven

Episodes

References

Black Ink Crew
2019 American television seasons
2020 American television seasons